Andreas Sørensen (born 1 August 1984) is a Danish footballer.

Career
On 3 August 2007 he signed a 1-year contract with Vejle Boldklub, but when the club secured promotion to the Danish Superliga he did not get his contract extended, so he was offered a 3-year deal by AB.

Sørensen played for HB Køge in the Danish Superliga in the 2011-12 season.

External links
 Vejle Boldklub profile

1984 births
Living people
Danish men's footballers
Association football defenders
Lyngby Boldklub players
Ølstykke FC players
Vejle Boldklub players
Akademisk Boldklub players
HB Køge players
Danish Superliga players